Bayport is a city in Washington County, Minnesota, United States. The population was 4,024 at the 2020 census.

Bayport is located along the St. Croix River, one mile south of Stillwater.

History
The City of Bayport began as three small settlements along the St. Croix River.  In 1873, the St. Croix Railway Improvement Company combined the three settlements into South Stillwater, which was incorporated as a village in 1881.  Because many people confused South Stillwater with the city of Stillwater, the city changed its name to Bayport in 1922.

Like its northern neighbor Stillwater, the early economy of Bayport centered around the lumber industry.  From 1852 to 1916, several sawmills operated within the City.  The Andersen Corporation is the successor to Bayport's early lumbering firms.  The Andersen Corporation (then the Andersen Lumber Company) moved to Bayport in 1913, among other reasons, to take advantage of the city's rail lines first built in 1872.  The Andersen Corporation prospered in Bayport, becoming the largest window and patio door manufacturer in the world.

In 1914, the Minnesota Correctional Facility - Stillwater moved from Stillwater to Bayport.  Experts at the time considered the prison to be one of the most modern penal institutions in the world.  As of 2010, the prison housed about 1600 inmates, who are counted as Bayport residents for census purposes.  The maximum security Minnesota Correctional Facility - Oak Park Heights opened just beyond Bayport's western boundary in 1982.

Due to its location on the St. Croix River, Bayport has long been associated with boating.  The Bayport Boat Yard, located just south of the Andersen Corporation, built several well-known steamboats.  Barge construction and repairs continued at the boatyard through World War Two. Today, the city is home to the Bayport Marina, and many boaters gain access to the St. Croix River at one of Bayport's public boat launches.

Geography

Minnesota State Highway 95 serves as a main route in the community.

Demographics

2010 census
As of the census of 2010, there were 3,471 people, 855 households, and 502 families residing in the city. The racial makeup of the city was 73.2% White, 19.1% African American, 4.8% Native American, 1.5% Asian, 0.2% from other races, and 1.2% from two or more races. Hispanic or Latino of any race were 4.1% of the population.

There were 855 households, of which 25.6% had children under the age of 18 living with them, 44.9% were married couples living together, 8.8% had a female householder with no husband present, 5.0% had a male householder with no wife present, and 41.3% were non-families. 34.4% of all households were made up of individuals, and 17.7% had someone living alone who was 65 years of age or older. The average household size was 2.20 and the average family size was 2.82.

The median age in the city was 36.9 years. 11.3% of residents were under the age of 18; 12.3% were between the ages of 18 and 24; 40.9% were from 25 to 44; 24.2% were from 45 to 64; and 11.4% were 65 years of age or older. The gender makeup of the city was 72.4% male and 27.6% female.

2000 census
As of the census of 2000, there were 3,162 people, 763 households, and 489 families residing in the city. The racial makeup of the city was 72.93% White, 17.99% African American, 4.46% Native American, 0.70% Asian, 0.98% from other races, and 2.94% from two or more races. Hispanic or Latino of any race were 3.19% of the population.

There were 763 households, out of which 26.6% had children under the age of 18 living with them, 49.1% were married couples living together, 9.7% had a female householder with no husband present, and 35.9% were non-families. 31.1% of all households were made up of individuals, and 15.1% had someone living alone who was 65 years of age or older.  The average household size was 2.28 and the average family size was 2.83.

In the city, the population was spread out, with 12.3% under the age of 18, 12.3% from 18 to 24, 47.3% from 25 to 44, 17.5% from 45 to 64, and 10.5% who were 65 years of age or older.  The median age was 35 years.

The median income for a household in the city was $53,026, and the median income for a family was $62,917. Males had a median income of $36,375 versus $32,024 for females. The per capita income for the city was $18,490.  About 2.0% of 420 families and 3.7% of the population were below the poverty line, including 5.5% of those under age 18 and 3.4% of those age 65 or over.

Economy
Bayport is the headquarters of the Andersen Corporation, a major manufacturer of windows.

Parks and recreation
Bayport has four public parks that offer recreation facilities. The parks include Lakeside Park, Barker's Alps Park, Perro Park and Village Green Park.

Education
Bayport is located in the Stillwater Area School District (ISD 834).

Public schools serving this area:

 Stillwater Area High School
 Oakland Jr. High
 Andersen Elementary School

Private schools serving this area:
 St. Croix Catholic School
 Salem Lutheran School

Charter schools serving this area:
 St. Croix Preparatory Academy
 New Heights Charter School

Infrastructure

Prison system
The Minnesota Correctional Facility - Stillwater is located in Bayport.

References

External links
 City of Bayport, Minnesota – Official Website
 ePodunk: Profile Profile for Bayport, Minnesota

Cities in Minnesota
Cities in Washington County, Minnesota
1873 establishments in Minnesota
Populated places established in 1873